Olesea Stamate (born 20 December 1983) is a Moldovan politician. She served as Minister of Justice from 24 June 2019 to 14 November 2019. Fadei Nagacevschi was appointed as her successor.

She has a bachelor's degree in law from Moldova State University. She also has a master's degree in European Interdisciplinary Studies from College of Europe in Natolin, Poland.

References 

Living people
1983 births
Place of birth missing (living people)
Women government ministers of Moldova
Moldovan Ministers of Justice
21st-century Moldovan politicians
Moldova State University alumni
College of Europe alumni
21st-century Moldovan women politicians
Female justice ministers